Territorial Council elections were held in the French overseas collectivity of Saint Barthélemy on 19 March 2017.

Results

References

2017 in Saint Barthélemy
Saint Barthelemy
2017 elections in France
2017 in France
Elections in Saint Barthélemy